Luxsar or Luxar (also spelled Llixar, Luxor) is a  mountain in Bolivia. It is located in the Potosí Department, Nor Lípez Province, Quemes Municipality. It lies north of the Chiwana salt flat (Salar de Chiguana).

See also 
 Pampa Luxsar

References 

Mountains of Potosí Department